Avia is a Czechoslovak aircraft company.

Avia may also refer to:

Places
 Avia, Messenia, a municipality in Greece
 Avià, a municipality in Spain
 Avia (river), in Spain

Business
 Avia (shoes), American shoe manufacturer
 Avia (gliders) Ateliers vosgiens d'industrie aéronautique, a French aircraft company
 Avia Vehicles, a Spanish brand of trucks
 Avia Air, an airline based in Aruba
 Avia Express, a Swedish charter airline
 Avia Traffic Company, an airline based in Kyrgyzstan
 AVIA International, a Swiss oil and gas company.

Other uses
 AVIA, a Russian band of the late 1980s
 Maxwell Avia, a fictional character in the New Zealand soap opera Shortland Street
 Avia of the New Gods, mother of Mister Miracle
 Avia II of the New Gods, daughter of Mister Miracle and Big Barda

See also
Avian (disambiguation)